Nancy Brooker Spain (13 September 1917 – 21 March 1964) was a prominent English broadcaster and journalist. She was a columnist for the Daily Express, She magazine, and the News of the World in the 1950s and 1960s. She also appeared on many radio broadcasts, particularly on Woman's Hour and My Word!, and later as a panelist on the television programmes What's My Line? and Juke Box Jury. Spain died in a plane crash near Aintree racecourse while travelling to the 1964 Grand National.

Early life
Spain was born in Jesmond, Newcastle upon Tyne, the younger of the two daughters of Lieutenant-Colonel George Redesdale Brooker Spain, a freeman of the city and prominent figure in local military and antiquarian affairs. Her father was a writer himself and appeared in a number of radio plays as well as broadcasting commentaries on Newcastle United games. Her mother, Norah Smiles, was the daughter of Lucy Dorling (a half-sister of Isabella Beeton) and William Holmes Smiles (son of Samuel Smiles).

As a child, Spain remembered pushing the future eminent journalist William Hardcastle into the Bull Park Lake on the Town Moor, where she used to learn to ride at five shillings an hour "with other little bourgeois tots".

Spain went to Roedean School (a family tradition) from 1931 to 1935, where she began wearing "mannish" clothes, and developed the speaking voice which stood her in such good stead in her eventual media career. She played lacrosse for Northumberland and Durham, and hockey for the North of England, as well as playing tennis and cricket. She also acted on BBC radio, where she took over the star parts vacated by Esther McCracken. She was a sports reporter for the Newcastle Journal, and had a love affair with local sportswoman Winifrid Sargeant. During the Second World War, Spain served in the WRNS on Tyneside, a period covered in her book Thank you, Nelson (1945). She served as a driver and was then commissioned, and worked in the WRNS press office in London.

Post-war career
After the war, Spain published several books, including a series of detective novels set at a girls school, Radcliff Hall, based on Roedean (the name a presumed allusion to Radclyffe Hall, and probably also to Lord Berners' novel The Girls of Radcliff Hall). This helped her become a star columnist for the Daily Express, She and the News of the World in the 1950s and 1960s, and made many radio broadcasts, particularly on Woman's Hour and My Word!. She later appeared as a panellist on BBC TV's record review programme Juke Box Jury and the panel game What's My Line?.

Her column-writing caused the Daily Express to be sued successfully for libel - twice - by Evelyn Waugh. As well as Spain's books of memoirs, including Why I'm Not a Millionaire (1956), she wrote a biography of her great aunt, Isabella Beeton (original author of the encyclopaedic Mrs Beeton's Book of Household Management), and a series of detective novels. Rose Collis wrote a posthumous biography of the broadcaster and journalist in 1997.

Private life
Often in the news and tempted to marry to seem respectable - Spain's name was linked with that of Gilbert Harding - she lived openly with the editor of She, Joan Werner Laurie (Jonny), and was a friend of the famous, including Noël Coward and Marlene Dietrich. She and Laurie were regulars at the Gateways club in Chelsea, London, and were widely known to be lesbians. Spain and Laurie lived in an extended household with the rally driver Sheila van Damm, and their sons Nicholas (born 1946) and Thomas (born in 1952). Nicholas was Laurie's son; Thomas was also described as Laurie's youngest son, but may have been Spain's son after an affair with Philip Youngman Carter, husband of Margery Allingham.

Spain died, with Laurie and three others, on 21 March 1964. They were flying in a Piper Apache aeroplane which crashed near Aintree racecourse, near Liverpool, killing all on board. The aircraft (G-ASHC) had taken off from Luton Airport and was on approach to land at the racecourse. Spain was travelling there to cover the 1964 Grand National, which was taking place that day.

She was cremated with Laurie at Golders Green Crematorium, London, and her ashes were put in the family grave in Horsley, Northumberland.

Coward summed up in his diary: "It is cruel that all that gaiety, intelligence and vitality should be snuffed out when so many bores and horrors are left living."

She is also the inspiration of the famous song 'Nancy Spain' written by Barney Rushe and made famous by, among others, Christy Moore.

Bibliography

Novels
 Death Before Wicket (1946)
 Poison in Play (1945)
 Murder, Bless It (1948)
 Death Goes on Skis (1949)
 Poison for Teacher (1949)
 Cinderella Goes to the Morgue (Minutes to Murder) (1950)
 R in the Month (1950)
 Not Wanted on Voyage (1951)
 Out, Damned Tot (1952)
 The Tiger Who Could't Eat Meat (1954)
 The Kat Strikes (1955)
 My Boy Mo (1959)
 Minutes to Midnight (rpt 1978)

Non-fiction
 Thank You, Nelson (1945)
 Mrs Beeton and Her Husband (1948)
 Teach Tennant: The Story of Eleanor Tennant, the Greatest Tennis Coach in the World (1953)
 The Beeton Story (1956)
 Why I'm Not A Millionaire (1956)
 The Nancy Spain Colour Cookery Book (1962)
 The Beaver Annual (ed) (1962)
 The Butlin Beaver Annual (ed) (1963)
 A Funny Thing Happened on the Way (1964)
 The Nancy Spain All Colour Cookery Book (1967)

References

Sources
 

1917 births
1964 deaths
20th-century English writers
20th-century women writers
British radio personalities
English lesbian writers
British LGBT journalists
British LGBT broadcasters
People educated at Roedean School, East Sussex
Writers from Newcastle upon Tyne
Victims of aviation accidents or incidents in England
Women's Royal Naval Service ratings
Women's Royal Naval Service officers
Royal Navy personnel of World War II
Royal Navy officers of World War II
Women mystery writers
Daily Express people
News of the World people
20th-century British journalists
20th-century English LGBT people